Agonal and agonist may refer to:

 Death rattle, deriving from the word agony
 Agonal heart rhythm, abnormal heart rhythm
 Agonal respiration, abnormal breathing pattern
 Agonist, the opposite of antagonist

See also
Agonic line